An emission-line star is a star whose spectrum exhibits emission lines in the optical spectra. Common types include:

 Be star
 Herbig Ae/Be star
 Shell star
 Wolf–Rayet star